Sänna is a village in Rõuge Parish, Võru County in southeastern Estonia. As of 2011 Census, the settlement's population was 55.

Poet and writer Artur Adson (1889–1977) grew up in Sänna village. Writer Juhan Jaik was born in Sänna.

Sänna manor
A manor has existed on the site since the Middle Ages, when it was a subsidiary manor to Vastseliina Castle. The present, wooden building however dates from 1875. Throughout history, the manor has belonged to several different Baltic German families, including the aristocratic families von Budberg, von Vietinghoff and von Fusch. It currently houses a library and a community centre and is open to the public.

Gallery

References

Villages in Võru County